The Antique Telescope Society (ATS) is a society for people interested in antique telescopes, binoculars, instruments, books, atlases, etc. It was established in 1992 and presently based in Virginia, the USA.

The society has an annual meeting. It also publishes the Journal of the Antique Telescope Society and has an active email list. The American astronomer Michael D. Reynolds was the President of the Antique Telescope Society.

References

External links
 Antique Telescope Society website
 

Organizations with year of establishment missing
Astronomy societies
Antiques
History of astronomy
History of technology
Telescopes
Organizations established in the 1990s